Meraki may refer to:

 Cisco Meraki. a cloud-managed IT company
 Meraki TV, a lifestyle show for Greeks living in Australia

See also
 Muraki (disambiguation)